Will Bunker is a serial entrepreneur and angel investor in San Francisco, California. He is the co-founder of GrowthX and board member of the Silicon Valley Growth Syndicate.

During the Dot-com Boom of the 1990s, Will founded popular dating site One & Only which was acquired in 1999 by TicketMaster  and later became part of Match.com. Prior to technology, Will consulted for NB Hunt and served in the United States Marine Corps.  Will graduated from Mississippi State University with a degree in Industrial Engineering.

Will is an avid speaker and blogger on entrepreneurship, including feature interviews by TiE and Mixergy.

References

American investors
Living people
Year of birth missing (living people)